William Earl Brown (born September 7, 1963) is an American actor, screenwriter, producer, musician, and songwriter. He is perhaps best known for his roles as Kenneth "Kenny" Brown in the film Scream (1996), Warren in the film There's Something About Mary (1998), Dan Dority on the HBO series Deadwood (2004–2006), and the voice and motion capture of Bill in the video game The Last of Us (2013). He has appeared in films such as Backdraft, The Master, Being John Malkovich, The Sessions, Vanilla Sky, The Lone Ranger, and Bloodworth (which he also wrote and produced), as well as series such as Seinfeld, NYPD Blue, C.S.I., C.S.I. Miami, The X-Files, Six Feet Under, Preacher, Bates Motel, True Detective, American Horror Story, Chicago Fire, and The Mandalorian.

Early life

Brown was born in Golden Pond, Kentucky. He earned a bachelor's degree from Murray State University before moving to Chicago, where he received an MFA from DePaul University Theatre School in 1989.

Career
After his breakout performance in Steppenwolf Theatre Company's outreach staging of Arthur Miller's A View from the Bridge, Brown began working in television and film. He appeared in films such as Backdraft, The Babe, Excessive Force, and Rookie of the Year. In 1993, he moved to Los Angeles and was cast in Wes Craven's New Nightmare. He also had a minor role in Craven's Vampire in Brooklyn, and a bigger one as a news cameraman working for Gale Weathers in Craven's Scream. He played Warren in the 1998 comedy film There's Something About Mary and later took roles in Being John Malkovich, Vanilla Sky, Dancing at the Blue Iguana, The Alamo, and The Big White. 

In 2009, Brown wrote, produced, and appeared in the film Bloodworth. His 2010s film credits include The Master, The Sessions, The Lone Ranger, Brother's Keeper, and Wild. On television, he is best known for his portrayal of Dan Dority on the HBO series Deadwood (2004–2006). He has also guest starred on Bates Motel, Rectify, Luck, American Horror Story, Justified, Six Feet Under, NYPD Blue, X-Files, The Mentalist, CSI: Crime Scene Investigation, Ellen, Seinfeld, True Detective, and others. He also portrayed singer Meat Loaf in VH1's television film Meat Loaf: To Hell and Back. In 2013, he performed the voice and motion capture of Bill in the critically acclaimed video game The Last of Us.

Brown also writes and performs with the country music band Sacred Cowboys.

He is set to appear in the upcoming film Shirley, which stars Regina King opposite Lance Reddick, Lucas Hedges, André Holland, Terrence Howard and newcomer Ethan Jones Romero.

Personal life
Brown married Carrie Paschall in 1989. They live in Los Angeles and have a daughter, Anna.

Filmography

Film

Television

Video games

References

External links
 
 

1963 births
Male actors from Kentucky
American male film actors
American male television actors
Living people
Murray State University alumni
DePaul University alumni
21st-century American male actors
20th-century American male actors
American male stage actors
American male video game actors
American male voice actors